Ed Rolston (born 12 August 1990) is a Hong Kong former international rugby union player. He is the youngest ever Hong Kong international, having represented Hong Kong at all age groups from under 14s through to the senior team when he was capped aged 17 years 4 months and 25 days. He was a member of the Hong Kong rugby academy and captained the Hong Kong Under 18s and Under 20s. His previous clubs are Loughborough Students RUFC (2009–2012, national division 1) where he represented the senior 1st team in 30 starts scoring 25 tries.

He played with Leicester Tigers for the 2010–2011 season and was part of the team that won the Aviva A League. He was also a member of the Leicester Tigers 1st team squad for the 2011–2012 season. He returned to Hong Kong in 2015 and now plays for the premiership side Valley RFC.

He has also represented Hong Kong in 7s, notably in the Hong Kong 7s in 2009 and the World Games in Kaohsiung in 2009.

He was part of the team that had Loughborough Students promoted to National division 1 and was the only Loughborough player to score in the losing playoff game against Jersey in 2011.

He was forced to retire from playing rugby in 2017 aged 26, due to a neck injury. He had already sought work as an actor, and it was reported that soon after leaving the sport he was involved in several media projects and the management of a restaurant.

References

1990 births
Living people
Hong Kong rugby union players
Hong Kong international rugby union players
Hong Kong international rugby sevens players
Leicester Tigers players
Valley RFC players
Hong Kong expatriate rugby union players
Expatriate rugby union players in England
Hong Kong expatriate sportspeople in England
Hong Kong people of Irish descent
Hong Kong male actors
Alumni of Loughborough University